APPD can refer to several things:
 Anarchist Pogo Party of Germany (German: Anarchistische Pogo-Partei Deutschlands)
 Asia Pacific Partnership on Development (an international climate change association)